The State of Colorado in the United States has 272 active municipalities, comprising 197 towns, 73 cities, and two consolidated city and county governments. At the 2020 United States Census, 4,299,942 of the 5,773,714 Colorado residents (74.47%) lived in one of these 272 municipalities. Another 714,417 residents (12.37%) lived in one of the 210 census-designated places, while the remaining 759,355 residents (13.15%) lived in the many rural and mountainous areas of the state.

Colorado municipalities range in population from the City and County of Denver, the state capital, with a 2020 population of 715,522, to the Town of Carbonate, which has had no year-round population since the 1890 Census due to its severe winter weather and difficult access. The City of Black Hawk with a 2020 population of 127 is the least populous Colorado city, while the Town of Castle Rock with a 2020 population of 73,158 is the most populous Colorado town.

Only  of Colorado's  of land area (1.90%) are incorporated in the 272 municipalities. The City of Glendale with a 2020 population density of 8,117 residents per square mile (3,134/km2) is the most densely populated municipality, while the Town of Bonanza with a 2020 population density of 38 residents per square mile (15/km2) is the least densely populated municipality after Carbonate.

Municipal government 
Colorado municipalities operate under one of five types of municipal governing authority – consolidated city and county, home rule municipality, statutory city, statutory town, and territorial charter municipality. State law makes relatively few distinctions between a city and a town. The charter of a home rule municipality may designate either a city or town municipal title. In general, cities are more populous than towns, although long-term population changes may skew this considerably, as illustrated by the City of Black Hawk and the Town of Castle Rock.

Neither village nor civil township is a type of civil division in the State of Colorado. However, the cities of Cherry Hills Village and Greenwood Village and the towns of Log Lane Village, Mountain Village, and Snowmass Village have the word "village" at the end of their names.

Nineteen Colorado municipalities extend into two counties, while two cities – Aurora and Littleton – extend into three counties.

Consolidated city and county
In the State of Colorado, only Denver and Broomfield have consolidated city and county governments. The City and County of Denver operates under Article XX, Section 4 of the Constitution of the State of Colorado; and Title 30, Article 11, Section 101 of the Colorado Revised Statutes. Denver has an elected mayor and a city council of 13 members with 11 members elected from council districts and two members elected at large. The City and County of Broomfield operates under Article XX, Sections 10–13 of the Constitution of the State of Colorado. Broomfield has an appointed city and county manager, an elected mayor, and a city council of 11 members composed of the mayor and two members elected from each of five wards.

Home rule municipality
Colorado has 62 cities and 37 towns that are home rule municipalities that are self-governing under Article 20 of the Constitution of the State of Colorado; Title 31, Article 1, Section 202 of the Colorado Revised Statutes; and the home rule charter of each municipality. The state-authorized home rule charter determines the form of government.

Statutory city
Colorado has 11 statutory cities that operate under Title 31, Article 1, Section 203 and Article 4, Section 100 or Section 200 of the Colorado Revised Statutes. Statutory cities have an elected mayor and a city council composed of the mayor and two members elected from each ward. A statutory city may petition to reorganize as a Section 200 statutory city with an appointed city manager and a city council with two members elected from each ward and one member elected at large. The mayor may be the city council member elected at large or the city council may appoint a mayor.

Statutory town
Colorado has 159 statutory towns that operate under Title 31, Article 1, Section 203 and Article 4, Part 3 of the Colorado Revised Statutes. Creede uses the official title "City of Creede" despite its status as a statutory town. Garden City, Lake City, Orchard City, and Sugar City are statutory towns despite the word "city" at the end of their names.

Statutory towns have an elected mayor and a board of trustees composed of the mayor and four or six additional members elected at large. Colorado statutory towns are similar to villages in other states such as the villages of the State of New York.

Territorial charter municipality
The Town of Georgetown is the only municipality that still operates under a charter granted by the Territory of Colorado. The town operates under Article 14, Section 13 of the Charter & Constitution of the Colorado Territory enacted on January 28, 1868. The town mayor is called the police judge and the town council is called the board of selectmen.

Municipalities

Municipalities in multiple counties
Twenty-one active municipalities currently extend into more than one county.

Gallery

See also

List of populated places in Colorado
List of census-designated places in Colorado
Population history of Colorado census-designated places
List of counties in Colorado
List of county seats in Colorado
Population history of Colorado counties
List of forts in Colorado
List of ghost towns in Colorado
List of historic places in Colorado
List of populated places in Colorado by county
List of post offices in Colorado
List of statistical areas in Colorado
Population history of Colorado municipalities

Notes

References

External links

United States Department of Commerce
United States Census Bureau
State of Colorado
Department of Local Affairs
Colorado Municipal League
History Colorado

 
Lists of places in Colorado
Lists of populated places in Colorado
Local government in Colorado
Colorado, List of municipalities in
Colorado, List of municipalities in

de:Gemeindeformen Colorados